Rory O'Connor may refer to:

 Ruaidrí Ua Conchobair (1116–1198), king of Connacht and High King of Ireland
 Rory O'Connor (Irish republican) (1883–1922), Irish republican who fought in the Irish War of Independence and the Irish Civil War
 Rory O'Connor (filmmaker) (active from 1985), American journalist, author and filmmaker
 Rory O'Connor (hurler) (born 1998), Irish hurler
 Rory O'Connor (rugby union) (born 1994), Australian rugby union player
 Rory O'Connor (author) (born 1964), Australian author and journalist